The list of Northeastern State University alumni includes notable alumni, faculty, and former students of the Northeastern State University.

Athletics
Billy Bock, late baseball coach for four high schools, won nine state titles
Michael Bowie, offensive lineman for the Cleveland Browns of the NFL, Super Bowl XLVIII champion
Jarrett Byers, former St. Louis Rams wide receiver
Larry Coker, former head coach at the University of Miami
Bob Hudson, former NFL player
Ronnie Jones, football coach
Rosie Manning, former NFL player
Derrick Moore, former NFL player

Arts and entertainment
Dennis Letts, college professor and actor
Jim Ross, former WWE play-by-play commentator; President of Talent Relations
Shawntel Smith, Miss America 1996
Carrie Underwood, American Idol Fox winner; country music star; winner of multiple Grammy Awards; Country Music's reigning Queen
The Swon Brothers, fourth season NBC third Place; country music duo

Business
Bob Berry, co-founder and chief executive officer of Tri-B Nursery, Inc. 
Ken Selby, founder of Mazzio's Italian Eatery
Jeff Storey, president and chief executive officer of Level 3 Communications

Politics
Bob Ballinger (B.A. in Social Studies Education), lawyer and Republican member of the Arkansas House of Representatives from District 97+ (Carroll, Madison, and Washington counties)
Glenn Coffee, former Oklahoma Secretary of State and president pro tempore of the Oklahoma Senate
Drew Edmondson, former Attorney General of Oklahoma
James E. Edmondson, current justice on the Oklahoma Supreme Court and former Chief Justice of the same court
Sandy Garrett, former Oklahoma Superintendent of Public Instruction
Ted Risenhoover, former U.S. Representative from Oklahoma
William G. Stigler, former U.S. Representative from Oklahoma
John A. Sullivan, former U.S. Representative from Oklahoma's 1st congressional district
Kimberly Teehee, senior policy adviser for Native American affairs in the administration of President Barack Obama

Science and Engineering
Mary G. Ross, first Native American female engineer; one of the Skunk Works founding engineers
Laura Sullivan-Beckers, biologist

Others
Bill Bright, founder of Campus Crusade for Christ
Sara Dye, physician and surgeon

References 

Northeastern State University alumni